Sialic acid-binding Ig-like lectin 10 is a protein that in humans is encoded by the SIGLEC10 gene.  Siglec-G is often referred to as the murine paralog of human Siglec-10

Structure and function
Like most but not all other Siglecs, Siglec-10 bears an ITIM (Immunoreceptor tyrosine-based inhibitory motif) within its cytoplasmic domain. Siglec-10 is a ligand for CD52, the target of the therapeutic monoclonal antibody Alemtuzumab. It is also reported to bind to Vascular adhesion protein 1 (VAP-1) and to the co-stimulatory molecule CD24 also known as HSA (Heat-stable antigen).

Gene family summary
SIGLECs are members of the immunoglobulin superfamily that are expressed on the cell surface. Most SIGLECs have 1 or more cytoplasmic immune receptor tyrosine-based inhibitory motifs, or ITIMs. SIGLECs are typically expressed on cells of the innate immune system, with the exception of the B-cell expressed SIGLEC6 (MIM 604405).[supplied by OMIM]

References

Further reading

SIGLEC